Chlorodifluoromethane or difluoromonochloromethane is a hydrochlorofluorocarbon (HCFC). It was commonly used as a propellant and refrigerant. These applications were phased out under the Montreal Protocol in developed countries in 2020 due to the compound's ozone depletion potential (ODP) and high global warming potential (GWP), and in developing countries this process will be completed by 2030. R-22 is a versatile intermediate in industrial organofluorine chemistry, e.g. as a precursor to tetrafluoroethylene.

Production and current applications 
Worldwide production of R-22 in 2008 was about 800Gg per year, up from about 450Gg per year in 1998, with most production in developing countries.  R-22 use is being phased out in developing countries, where it is largely used for air conditioning applications. Air conditioning sales are growing 20% annually in India and China.

R-22 is prepared from chloroform:
HCCl3 + 2 HF → HCF2Cl + 2 HCl

An important application of R-22 is as a precursor to tetrafluoroethylene.  This conversion involves pyrolysis to give difluorocarbene, which dimerizes:
2 CHClF2 → C2F4 + 2 HCl

The compound also yields difluorocarbene upon treatment with strong base and is used in the laboratory as a source of this reactive intermediate.

The pyrolysis of R-22 in the presence of chlorofluoromethane gives hexafluorobenzene.

Environmental effects 
R-22 is often used as an alternative to the highly ozone-depleting CFC-11 and CFC-12, because of its relatively low ozone depletion potential of 0.055, among the lowest for chlorine-containing haloalkanes.  However, even this lower ozone depletion potential is no longer considered acceptable.

As an additional environmental concern, R-22 is a powerful greenhouse gas with a GWP equal to 1810 (which indicates 1810 times as powerful as carbon dioxide).  Hydrofluorocarbons (HFCs) are often substituted for R-22 because of their lower ozone depletion potential, but these refrigerants often have a higher GWP. R-410A, for example, is often substituted, but has a GWP of 2088. Another substitute is R-404A with a GWP of 3900. Other substitute refrigerants are available with low GWP. Ammonia (R-717), popular in the early years of refrigeration, has a GWP of <1 and remains a popular substitute on fishing vessels. Ammonia's toxicity and flammability limit its safe application.

Propane (R-290), is another example, and has a GWP of 3. Propane was the de facto refrigerant in systems smaller than industrial  scale before the introduction of CFCs. The reputation of propane refrigerators as a fire hazard kept delivered ice and the ice box the overwhelming consumer choice despite its inconvenience and higher cost until safe CFC systems overcame the negative perceptions of refrigerators. Illegal to use as a refrigerant in the USA for decades, propane is now permitted for use in limited mass suitable for small refrigerators. It is not lawful to use in air conditioners, or larger refrigerators because of its flammability and potential for explosion.

Phaseout in the European Union 

Since 1 January 2010, it has been illegal to use newly manufactured HCFCs to service refrigeration and air-conditioning equipment, only reclaimed and recycled HCFCs may be used.  In practice this means that the gas has to be removed from the equipment before servicing and replaced afterwards, rather than refilling with new gas.

Since 1 January 2015, it has been illegal to use any HCFCs to service refrigeration and air-conditioning equipment; broken equipment that used HCFC refrigerants must be replaced with equipment that does not use them.

Phaseout in the United States 
R-22 was mostly phased out in new equipment in the United States by regulatory action by the US EPA under the SNAP, Significant New Alternatives Program by rules 20 and 21 of the program, due to its high global warming potential. The EPA program was consistent with the Montreal Accords, but international agreements must be ratified by the US Senate to have legal effect. A 2017 decision of the US Court of Appeals for the District of Columbia Circuit held that the US EPA lacked authority to regulate the use of R-22 under the SNAP program. In essence the court ruled the EPA's statutory authority, was for ozone reduction not global warming. The EPA subsequently issued guidance to the effect that the EPA would no longer regulate R-22. A 2018 ruling by same court in held that the EPA failed to conform with required procedure when it issued its guidance pursuant to the 2017 ruling, voiding the guidance, but not the prior ruling that required it. The refrigeration and air conditioning industry had already discontinued production of new R-22 equipment. The practical effect of these rulings is to reduce the cost of imported R-22 to maintain aging equipment extending its service life while keeping the use of R-22 in new equipment too risky to pursue.

R-22, retrofit using substitute refrigerants 

The energy efficiency and system capacity of systems designed for R-22 is slightly greater using R-22 than the available substitutes.

R-407A is for use in low- and medium-temp refrigeration. Uses a polyolester (POE) oil.

R-407C is for use in air conditioning. Uses a minimum of 20 percent POE oil.

R-407F is for use in medium- and low-temperature refrigeration applications (supermarkets, cold storage, and process refrigeration); direct expansion system design only. Uses a POE oil.

R-407H is for use in medium- and low-temperature refrigeration applications (supermarkets, cold storage, and process refrigeration); direct expansion system design only. Uses a POE oil.

R-421A is for use in "air conditioning split systems, heat pumps, supermarket pak systems, dairy chillers, reach-in storage, bakery applications, refrigerated transport, self-contained display cabinets, and walk-in coolers." Uses mineral oil (MO), Alkylbenzene (AB), and POE.

R-422B is for use in low-, medium-, and high-temperature applications. It is not recommended for use in flooded applications.

R-422C is for use in medium- and low-temperature applications. The TXV power element will need to be changed to a 404A/507A element and critical seals (elastomers) may need to be replaced.

R-422D is for use in low-temp applications, and is mineral oil compatible.

R-424A is for use in air conditioning as well as medium-temp refrigeration temperature ranges of 20 to 50˚F. It works with MO, alkylbenzenes (AB), and POE oils.

R-427A is for use in air conditioning and refrigeration applications. It does not require all the mineral oil to be removed. It works with MO, AB, and POE oils.

R-434A is for use in water cooled and process chillers for air conditioning and medium- and low-temperature applications. It works with MO, AB, and POE oils.

R-438A (MO-99) is for use in low-, medium-, and high-temperature applications. It is compatible with all lubricants.

R-458A is for use in air conditioning and refrigeration applications, without capacity or efficiency loss. Works with MO, AB, and POE oils.

R-32 or HFC-32 (difluoromethane) is for use in air conditioning and refrigeration applications. it has zero ozone depletion potential (ODP) [2] and a global warming potential (GWP) index 675 times that of carbon dioxide.

Physical properties 

It has two allotropes: crystalline II below 59K and crystalline I above 59K and below 115.73K.

Next diagram represents the pressure-enthalpy R22 properties, using Refprop 9.0 database, using the International Institute of Refrigeration reference.

Table of thermal and physical properties of saturated liquid refrigerant 22:

Price history and availability 

EPA's analysis indicated the amount of existing inventory was between 22,700t and 45,400t.

TBD: To be determined

In 2012 the EPA reduced the amount of R-22 by 45%, causing the price to rise by more than 300%. For 2013, the EPA has reduced the amount of R-22 by 29%.

References

External links 
 MSDS from DuPont
 
 Data at Integrated Risk Information System: IRIS 0657
 CDC – NIOSH Pocket Guide to Chemical Hazards – Chlorodifluoromethane
 Phase change data at webbook.nist.gov
 IR absorption spectra
 IARC summaries and evaluations: Vol. 41 (1986), Suppl. 7 (1987), Vol. 71 (1999)

Halomethanes
Hydrochlorofluorocarbons
Ozone depletion
Greenhouse gases
Refrigerants
Propellants
Airsoft
IARC Group 3 carcinogens